Apostolos Nikolaidis may refer to:
Apostolos Nikolaidis (athlete), Greek athlete and Panathinaikos ex president
Apostolos Nikolaidis Stadium, a stadium named for the above athlete located in Athens, Greece
Apostolos Nikolaidis (singer), Greek singer

Nikolaidis, Apostolos